151 Wing may refer to:

No. 151 Wing RAF, a British air unit active during World War II
151st Air Refueling Wing of the United States Air Force